Tokyo Blue is Najee's third album, released by Capitol Records in 1990.

Critical reception

Jonathan Widran of AllMusic writes, "Immensely pleasurable, a fun listen from beginning to end."

Smooth Jazz Therapy writes of Tokyo Blue, "The way it blended jazz with R & B, placed him right at the top of his urban jazz game and his judicious use of featured vocalists was starting a trend in smooth jazz which has endured to this day."

Yumi L. Wilson of AP News reports that, "Najee won best jazz album for his Tokyo Blue at the 1991 Soul Train Music Awards.

See original reviews for full articles. Links can be found in the references section of this article.

Charts
Top Contemporary Jazz Albums No. 1

Billboard 200 No. 63

Track listing

All track information and credits taken from the CD liner notes.

References

External links
Najee Official Site
Capitol Records Official Site

1990 albums
Najee albums
Capitol Records albums